Druzhba is an urban-type settlement in Pryluky Raion, Chernihiv Oblast, Ukraine. It belongs to Ichnia urban hromada, one of the hromadas of Ukraine. Population:

History
In 2013 the population of the settlement was 1007 people.

Until 18 July 2020, Druzhba belonged to Ichnia Raion. The raion was abolished in July 2020 as part of the administrative reform of Ukraine, which reduced the number of raions of Chernihiv Oblast to five. The area of Ichnia Raion was merged into Pryluky Raion.

Transportation
The closest railway station, Avgustovskyi, is several kilometers away from the settlement, on the railway connecting Bakhmach and Pryluky. There is infrequent passenger traffic.

Roads connects Druzhba with Ichnia and Mala Divytsia. In Mala Dyvitsia, there is access to Highway H08 connecting Kiev and Sumy.

References

Urban-type settlements in Pryluky Raion